Judy Alvarez (born April 2, 1943) is an American former professional tennis player.

Alvarez grew up in the Tampa neighbourhood of Ybor City and is of mixed Cuban and Italian descent. Her Cuban-American father was a bus driver and her Sicilian born mother worked in a cigar factory.

A Florida state junior champion, Alvarez won the Orange Bowl in 1961 and the following year graduated from Jefferson High School. She attended the University of Tampa on a football scholarship, with the college yet to have established a women's tennis team.

Alvarez's best performance at Wimbledon, when she made the round of 16 in 1964, included a win over future champion Virginia Wade. She also reached the round of 16 at the French and U.S. Championships during her career.

By the age of 21 she was ranked sixth nationally, but then suddenly quit the tour after being overlooked for the Wightman Cup team, despite having recently beaten rivals including Darlene Hard and Billie Jean Moffitt.

In the 1970s she made a brief comeback to the professional tour.

References

External links
 

1943 births
Living people
American female tennis players
Tennis players from Tampa, Florida
American sportspeople of Cuban descent
American people of Italian descent
College women's tennis players in the United States
University of Tampa alumni